A Germanism is a loan word or other loan element borrowed from German for use in some other language.

Linguistic domains 
 The military or public administration
 Russian špicruteny (шпицрутены, from German Spießruten(-laufen)), "running the gauntlet")
 English blitz (from German Blitz(-krieg), lit. "lightning-fast war")
 German culture (or concepts that were first made notable in a German context)
 French le  waldsterben (from German Waldsterben "forest dieback")
 English uses of gemuetlichkeit, wanderlust or schadenfreude

Technology and engineering have also provided Germanisms, as in the English bremsstrahlung (a form of electromagnetic radiation), or the French schnorchel (literally, "submarine snorkel," a type of air-intake device for submarine engines).

Examples in different languages

Afrikaans

In Afrikaans, a colloquial term for ethnic Germans is aberjetze, from German aber jetzt! ("come on, now!"), possibly due to the frequent use of that phrase by German farmers or overseers in exhorting their workers.

Albanian 
Albanian has many loan words brought back from Germany by migrant workers. Krikëll for "beer mug," for example, is borrowed from the Austrian German term Krügel. The German word Schalter has been borrowed in both its meanings ("(office) counter" and "(electric) switch") as Albanian shalter.

Arabic 
In the early 20th century, German film directors participated in the creation of the Egyptian cinema and usually concluded their work with the word fertig (done). Their local staff kept that word in the form ferkish and soon used it in other contexts.

In connection with the football World Cup, the German team is called farik el Mannschaft, with the German Mannschaft meaning team – wherein farik is already the Arabic term for "team" and is supplemented by the article el. When at the football World Cup of 2006 the German team lost to Italy, a saying went el Mannschaft khessret! ("The Mannschaft lost!")

In Sudan, the German word Kollege (colleague) acquired a very unusual importance. There it means straw, which was bound to a bundle for drying. The background to this important change is that colleagues are seen in the context of staying closely together.

Bassa 
In Bassa, a tribal language in Cameroon, the word for "train station" is banop from the German Bahnhof, which recalls the Germans building the first railway in their former colony.

Bosnian 
Bosnian has a number of loanwords from German: šlager (hit, from Schlager), šminka (make-up, from Schminke), šnajder (tailor, from Schneider), šunka (ham, from Schinken) etc. In the Bosnian language rikverc means the reverse gear of a vehicle that is best to be rostfraj, stainless. The German equivalents are rückwärts and rostfrei respectively.

Bulgarian 
German words which were adopted into the Bulgarian language include бормашина, "drill", from German Bohrmaschine, ауспух, "exhaust pipe" from Auspuff, шибидах from Schiebedach and in the skiing sport the term Шус, which is the same as the English "schuss", was adopted from Schussfahrt, a steep and fast ride downhill.

Even the German word Anzug, "suit", is used in Bulgarian. However, it means "tracksuit" there.

Chinese 
One of the very few German loan words in Chinese is the word for storm drain covers, Gullideckel in German. The common Chinese term for "rain water hole",  雨水口, yushuikou,  is called guli, 骨瀝, in the Qingdao form – contrary to the rest of China. The Chinese learned of storm drains for city sewage in the German lease area of Jiaozhou. The approximately 40 German loan words that are in use in Qingdao still include the word 大嫚, daman, for Damen, "ladies" with 胶州大嫚 meaning "Jiaozhou-women".

Croatian 

In the Austro-Hungarian monarchy, typical Austrian German words such as paradajz (Paradeiser meaning from paradise, for tomato, the verbatim translation rajčica is increasingly used), špajza (Speise, "food", used in the sense of "pantry"), knedli (Knödel, "dumplings"), putar (Butter, "butter", natively maslac), ribizli (Ribisel, "currants"), šnicla (Schnitzel, "flat piece of meat", natively odrezak), Fijaker (Fiaker, "fiacre"), foranga (Vorhang, "curtain", natively zavjesa), herceg (Herzog, "Duke", natively vojvoda), majstor (Meister, "master", often in the sense of "repairman") or tišljar (Tischler, "carpenter", natively stolar).

Similarly, words such as pleh (Blech, "tin"), cajger (Zeiger, "pointer"), žaga (Säge, "saw"), šalter (Schalter, "switch"), šrafciger (Schraubenzieher, "screwdriver", natively odvijač) or curik or rikverc (Zurück, "back" or rückwärts "backwards", for the reverse gear) are common in Croatia. Especially in the technical fields there are almost no phonetic differences with the German words, and most Croats understand these without good language skills in German.

Other common Terms:
Klavir-Piano (from German Klavier)
Bagger- excavator/backhoe (from German Bager)
Krigle- Beer mug (from German krügen jugs) 
Kapiram- I understand (from German kapiert) (native shvaćam)
Spika-German spitze used like Italian cosa to mean thing or Polish mowa to mean lingo.

Less commonly, the terms špajscimer (Speisezimmer, "dining room"), badecimer (Badezimmer, "bathroom"), forcimer (Vorzimmer, "hall"), šlafcimer (Schlafzimmer, "bedroom") and cimer fraj (Zimmer frei, "free room") are used in the colloquial language, as these newer loans mainly appear in advertising aimed for German tourists.

The washing machine is often referred to colloquially as vešmašina (Waschmaschine, natively perilica za rublje). Somewhat odd is the use of the term cušpajz (Zuspeise, "additional food") for a kind of vegetable stew.

Czech 
The Czech language borrowed some words from neighbouring dialects such as hajzl (from Häusl for a little house) as a vulgar word for toilet. In hřbitov (cemetery) comes from "hrob" (tomb), which comes from German Grab.

German words were imported so frequently that already Jan Hus (1412) vehemently opposed them. There were words like hantuch from German Handtuch for towel, šorc from Schürze for apron, knedlík from Knödel, hausknecht, German Hausknecht, for servant and forman from Fuhrmann for waggoner. But Hus did not succeed. Knedlíky are still served, and in 1631, the school reformer Jan Amos Komenský didn't have a problem to translate the biblical term paradise with lusthaus (German Lusthaus "house of joy").

In the late 19th century, many Czech craftsmen worked in the German-speaking area of the Danube monarchy. Czech adopted many loan words from this category: ermloch from German Ärmelloch for arm hole, flikovat from German flicken for darning and piglovat from bügeln for ironing.

In domestic disputes, German was a supplier of cuss words. Václav Havel used the word glajchšaltace (German Gleichschaltung) to denounce the forced bringing-into-line, and called his counterpart Václav Klaus an oberkašpar. (German vernacular Oberkaspar literally "master Kasperle", "master buffoon"). He, in turn, called Havel a lump (German Lump: approximately rascal, rapscallion). Sometimes opponents completely use German in order to insult each other. Such an insult may be, for example: Sie blöde Ente, "you stupid duck" (in German, this animal, however, is usually not used as a cuss).

Other (sometimes used colloquially) Germanisms in Czech:

haksna: legs, from Austrian Haxen)
stangla: top tube of a bicycle, from German Stange (rod, pole)
ksicht: grimace, from Gesicht (face)
hic: heat, from Hitze
lochna: hole, from Loch
betla: bed, from Bett
cimra: chamber, from Zimmer
flek: blotch, place, from Fleck
flastr: adhesive plaster, from Pflaster
fusakle: socks, from Fußsocken (German Fuß feet, German Socken socks)
futro: feed, from Futter
fuč: from futsch, colloquial German for "gone", "broken"
kamarád: friend, from Kamerad
hercna: heart, from Herz
cálovat: to pay, from zahlen
biflovat: swatting, from büffeln
durch: through, from durch
plac: place, from Platz
"furt": continuously from "fort". 
"plech" and "plechovka": iron sheet - (beer) can. 
"pucflek": orderly (an officer's servant) from Putzfleck - one who cleans stains
"makat" - to work from machen.
"vuřt" - sausage from Wurst.
 "grunt" - yard, land from Grund.
"hergot!!!" - "Jesus! or "Holy cow!" - cursing...
"ajznboňák" - railway worker, from Eisenbahn

Danish 
The modern Danish language emerged after centuries of heavy German influence due to the fact that Christianity was brought by German monks, and that nearly all clerks at the royal court were (literate) Germans. Thus well over half of the Danish lexical mass came in the 13th cent. and is of German origin, though not the basic grammatical structure, which remained Scandinavian. The same is true for Swedish, while the Norwegian in its most used form is in fact Danish, albeit with a very different pronunciation. It is in fact difficult to compile a full Danish sentence which would not include any old German words. This process was reinforced in the 18th cent. with a new wave of German clerks at the court of kings and queens who were to a great extent German princes.

The interesting words in this respect are those who were not integrated into the language, but are openly used as Germanisms. The German term Hab und Gut, "Habseligkeiten", is used in the form of habengut to express one's possessions carried along. The word was introduced to Denmark by travelling journeymen who took all their possessions along with them. 
"Fingerspitzgefühl" is commonly used in the original German sense: sensitivity, feeling with the tips of your fingers. The old German princely quote "So ein Ding müssen wir auch haben" (We should also have one of those things) is even the title of a TV show about electronics. 
The expression "Det sker i de bedste familier" (It happens in the best of families) is a crude translation of the German "Es kommt in den besten Familien vor".

Bundesliga-hår ("Bundesliga hair") is the Danish word for a mullet, because this type of haircut (as well as in Hungary) was regarded a characteristic of football Bundesliga players. Also the Italians saw this kind of connection and dubbed it capelli alla tedesca (German style haircut).

Dutch 
The Dutch language includes many well established words from German, for example überhaupt (at all, generally), sowieso (anyway/certainly). More specific terms include the word unheimisch, which is used for something scary (in German only another form of this word is still used: unheimlich), and the sports term Schwalbe (in German the bird swallow, but also used for "diving" in football). Furthermore, calques such as moederziel alleen ("all alone", from mutterseelenallein) are quite common.

English 

One notable German word in the English language is "kindergarten", meaning "garden for the children". The first kindergarten outside the German area was founded in 1851 in London. Five years later, Margarethe Schurz opened the first kindergarten in America in Watertown, Wisconsin. The language in the first kindergarten was German, as they were thought to be for the children of German immigrants. In 1882, the number of kindergartens in the US was 348. Meanwhile, the majority of Americans are no longer aware of the German origin of the word. The kindergarten teacher was first called "kindergartner", and later "kindergarten teacher". "Kindergartner" is now the child who attends the kindergarten. The verb "to kindergarten" means using the kindergarten method. Often, however, only the first letter 'K' of the word "kindergarten" is used, so a "pre-K" is a child who is not old enough for kindergarten.

In English, the German "über" (hyper, over) is sometimes (often spelled "uber") used in compositions, as in ubergeek, to express extreme progression. In German the prefix "super" is sometimes used, next to "über", in the sense of superior, as in Superminister. The peculiar feature of the German language to build compound nouns contributes to proliferation of Germanisms and interesting neologisms.

American students often use the term "foosball" (German Fußball) for the tabletop football, for which in Germany however the English term "kicker" is used.

If somebody is sneezing, one may respond "[god] bless you". Because many people don't want to use a blessing phrase with religious context, instead the German term "gesundheit" is widely used. In German, Gesundheit means health, but is also used as response when someone sneezes. The same word is used in Yiddish, and thus came to be known also in the US.

The Concise Oxford English Dictionary lists the German word verboten, defined as "forbidden by an authority". Other well known examples include words such as weltschmerz, mensch, rucksack, schadenfreude, kaput(t) and weltanschauung. Another important psychological concept is "Angst".

Estonian 
There are long-lasting contacts between Estonian and German languages. Estonia was conquered in the Livonian crusade by German and Danish crusaders already in the 13th century. Since then, Estonia was settled by priests, merchants and craftsmen from Germany. As a result, the Estonian language has borrowed nearly a third of its vocabulary from Germanic languages, mainly from German. Examples include: vein (Wein, wine), klaver (Klavier, piano), reis (Reise, trip) and kunst (art). Modern loans from the Germans include reisibüroo (Reisebüro, travel agency) and kleit (Kleid, dress).

French 
In French, some Germanisms are due to the experiences in the Second World War, such as witz for a bad joke or threatening (in German, Witz is just joke) and ersatz for ersatz coffee (German Ersatzkaffee, but more usually Muckefuck, itself probably a Francesism from mocca faux), or as an adjective meaning make-believe, fall-back, i.e. (as in German) some replacement used for lack of the authentic stuff.

The word lied, same meaning in English and French, is derived from the German Lied which translates as "song". (In German, the term Lied refers to any kind of song, however for contemporary music in German also often the anglicism Song is used.)

In French the word vasistas denotes a skylight window. The word probably originates from the Napoleonic Wars, when French soldiers looking at the German skylight ask Was ist das? (What is this?) It then became the name for this kind of windows.

Schubladiser is the Swiss French term for filing or procrastinating something. The noun is schubladisation. Schublade is German for drawer, therefore these Swiss French terms can be literally translated as "drawering" and "drawerisation", resp.

In Swiss French, there are some terms derived from (Swiss) German such as poutzer instead of nettoyer (cleaning, in German putzen) or speck instead of lard (bacon, in German Speck).

Around the German-French border areas, inherently many words cross the language border, for example, in Lorraine: Instead of ça éclabousse, ça spritz is used for "this sputters" – spritzen is "sputtering" in German. Spritz as a term for extruded biscuits (Spritzgebäck in German) is known everywhere in France.

Greek
Modern Greek uses a few German loanwords for terms related to German or Austrian culture, such as snitsel (σνίτσελ; Schnitzel) and froilain (φροϊλάιν, from Fräulein, "Miss", used only for young women from Germany or Austria). Some loan words were introduced by the gastarbáiter ( γκασταρμπάιτερ , German Gastarbeiter), who have spent part of their life in Germany or Austria, such as lumben (λούμπεν), meaning "riffraff", from German Lumpen, "rogues".

Hebrew
Modern Hebrew includes several Germanisms, some coming directly from German, and some via the Yiddish language. In the artisanal sector, some German phrases such as stecker (German Stecker for plug) and dübel (German Dübel for dowel), the latter pronounced  due to the missing "ü" umlaut. 

The German word Strudel (שטרודל) in Hebrew is used for the character "@" in E-mail addresses, after the shape of the pastry.

A Hebrew slang for siesta, is schlafstunde (German literally "hour to sleep"), although it is not clear whether the Yekkes started that habit in Israel or brought it from Germany.

The modern month names in Israel correspond to the German names: Januar, Februar, März, etc. The only modification is August which is – different from the German – pronounced "Ogust", because the vocal connection "au" in Hebrew is unusual.

Hungarian 
The German vocabulary had already influenced the Hungarian language at the time of the marriage of the state's founder Stephen I of Hungary to princess Giselle of Bavaria in the year 996. An early example is the word Herzog ("Duke"). The Hungarian word herceg formed as a result of vowel harmony, the alignment of vowels in a word. This Hungarian word was later borrowed into South Slavic languages and gave rise to the geographical name Hercegovina.

German clergy, farmers and craftsmen were linguistically influential, particularly in the 13th and 18th centuries, bringing their own terminology to Hungary. These include the job titles bakter (Wächter, night watchman, train guard), suszter (Schuster, cobbler) and sintér (Schinder, a knacker) as well as the terms kuncsaft (Kundschaft, customer) and mester (Meister, master). In some professions, a large part of technical terms came via German, e.g. in the field of carpentry lazur (Lasur, glaze), firnisz (Firnis, lacquer), lakk (Lack, varnish), smirgli (Schmirgelpapier, sandpaper) and colstok (Zollstock, foot rule).

Words were also loaned in the time of the monarchs from the House of Habsburg. This explains a number of German words that are mainly used in Austria. These include the words krampusz (Krampus, companion of Santa Claus), partvis (Bartwisch, hand brooms), nokedli (Nocken, dumpling), and ribizli (Ribisel, currant). Eszcájg derives from Esszeug. Second-hand goods dealers were called handlé (Händler, merchant). Further examples include fasírt (Austrian German faschiert, minced meat) and knődli (Knödel, hot dumplings).

Even a German sentence became a Hungarian word. Vigéc, derived from the German greeting Wie geht's? (How are you?) is the Hungarian word for a door-to-door salesman. The word spájz (Speis, Austrian German for Speisekammer) is being used for the pantry.
The Hungarian phrase nem nagy vasziszdasz ("not a big what-is-it") is an informal way of belittling the complexity/importance of something (from German was ist das?, what is it?).

Italian 
Sometimes linguistic communities borrow the same term for a word from each other's language. This is the case for razzia – the Germans taken their word Razzia from the Italians (originally Arab غزوة ghazwa = "razzia"), the Italians use the term blitz for this, from the German word Blitzkrieg. Un lager in Italian is not a beer like in English, but short for Konzentrationslager.

German tourists' demand brought il würstel to Italy (Würstel is a German dialect word for sausages), and even il würstel con crauti (German Kraut short for Sauerkraut).

Japanese 

Japanese includes some words with German origin, such as アルバイト (arubaito) from the German Arbeit ("work", "job"); however, in Japan it is used to denote a minor job, e.g., a student's sideline.

Other words transferred into Japanese are related to climbing, like ヒュッテ (hyutte) from German Hütte for mountain hut, ゲレンデ (gerende) from German "Gelände" for terrain, アイゼン (aizen) from German Eisen (short for Steigeisen) for crampons, エーデルワイス (ēderuwaisu) for Edelweiß, リュックサック (ryukkusakku) from German Rucksack for backpack and probably also シュラフ (shurafu) from German Schlafsack for sleeping bag. Also, the main Japanese mountain chain is called Japanese Alps.

During the Second World War, in Japanese weekly newsreels the military victories of the German Generalfeldmarschall Erwin Rommel in Africa were frequently celebrated, thus establishing rommel as the Japanese term for victory or success. Even today, Japanese football mascots are called with this word.

Since the medical education initially was influenced by its German teachers, many German medical terms became part of the Japanese language. These include クランケ (kuranke) from German Kranke as a term for the sick ones, カルテ (karute) from German Karte (card) in the sense of a card to record the course of disease of a patient, ギプス (gipusu) from German Gips for an orthopedic cast, アレルギー (arerugī) from German Allergie for allergy, and ノイローゼ (noirōze) from German Neurose for neurosis. Even the word オルガスムス (orugasumusu) for orgasm originates from the German word Orgasmus.

Of the typical German food items, the most commonly found in Japan are ザワークラウト (sawākurauto, Sauerkraut) and the cake specialties シュトレン (shutoren, Stollen) and バウムクーヘン (baumukūhen, Baumkuchen).

Kashubian 
The German language also influenced Kashubian and other Slavic languages, for example kajuta from German Kajüte for (ship) cabin,  bùrméster from German Bürgermeister for mayor or hańdel from German Handel for trade.
In Kashubian szlafrok from German Schlafrock is a dressing-gown.
A Kashubian craftsman uses a szruwa (screw, from German Schraube).

 Kirundi 
In Kirundi, the language of the African Great Lakes country Burundi, the word for German people (the former colonial rulers) is dagi. That is derived from the German salutation Tag, short for Guten Tag (literally "[I wish you a] good day").

 Korean 
In order to remove the last relics of the occupation during the Second World War, in South Korea most Japanese loanwords are removed from the vocabulary. This does not include the word 아르바이트 (areubaiteu) which is still used both in the Korean and Japanese language. The Japanese アルバイト (arubaito) is derived from the German word Arbeit (work, job), but here denotes a student's sideline.

Although a majority of internationalisms (largely Latin or Greek-based) are borrowed from English, a considerable minority of internationalisms are borrowed from German, usually via Japanese, in the field of chemistry, medicine, philosophy, etc., such as 요오드 (yoodeu < Iod), 망간 (manggan < Mangan), 부탄 (butan < Butan), 알레르기 (allereugi < Allergie), 히스테리 (hiseuteri < Hysterie), 이데올로기 (ideollogi < Ideologie), 테마 (Tema < Thema), etc. In addition, there are also loanwords of native German origin, such as 코펠 (kopel (portable cooker), a corrupted form of Kocher, via Japanese コッヘル kohheru), and hybrids like 메스실린더 (meseusillindeo <German Mess- (measuring) + English cylinder; Messzylinder in German).

 Macedonian 
In Macedonian, the denotation of witz is виц, similar as in French.

 Norwegian 
The German word Vorspiel translates to "prelude", also with sexual connotation, and Nachspiel translates to aftermath. In contrast, in Norwegian the words vorspiel and nachspiel stand for the consumption of alcoholic beverages before or after a visit of bars or discothèques (German "vorglühen", a quite recent neologism reflecting the use of Glühwein, and "Absacker").

 Polish 
The German language also greatly influenced Polish and other West Slavic languages, especially due to German settlement, shared borders and the implied policy of Germanisation after the Partitions of Poland. The majority of all the borrowed words in Polish are of German or Germanic origin. For example, kajuta from German Kajüte for (ship) cabin, sztorm from German Sturm for storm, burmistrz from German Bürgermeister for mayor, szynka from German Schinken for ham, or handel from German Handel for trade. Because most cities in Poland were founded on German Magdeburg Law in the Middle Ages many construction-related terms were borrowed, for instance, rynek (Ring - square or place or market); plac - Platz - square; cegła - Ziegel - brick; budynek - Büding - building (medieval High German) - with scores of derivatives on building materials, etc. Gmach (building) - from Gemach - a room.

In Polish, szlafmyca from German Schlafmütze means night cap, but – as in German – also used in a figurative sense as sleepyhead. Szlafrok from German Schlafrock is a dressing-gown.

A Polish craftsman uses a śruba (screw, from German Schraube) and klajster (paste/glue from German Kleister). If he does not know the name of his tool, he may ask for a wihajster (thingamabob, from German Wie heißt er? meaning how is it called?). He will receive the requested thing: Podaj mi ten mały wihajster! (Please give me the small thingamabot!)
There is also the word fajrant (leisure-time, from German Feierabend). In a carousal, he can drink to someone bruderszaft (from German Bruderschaft, fraternity) and disband with a rausz (from German Rausch, inebriation).

In Polish Upper Silesia most  of inhabitants speak standard Polish language but there is minority, who speak the Silesian dialect/language, they also use German words in every day life as either slang or as directly borrowed terms. In  Upper Silesia and Katowice it is customary to use blumy instead of kwiat for a flower (German: Blume), if someone speaks Silesian.

 Portuguese 
Portuguese incorporates German words such as diesel and kitsch.In Brazilian Portuguese, German immigrants brought some German words. The word blitz describes a traffic control (German Blitz is flash, also colloquial for traffic control due to the flash light.) Also known are malzbier, quark and chopp, the latter from Schoppen (German for a pint, in Brazilian Portuguese however denoting a draught beer). Also, in Brazil the German Streuselkuchen is a cuca, spread on a bread in the Riograndian Hunsrückian became, via the German schmier (grease), chimia. In the areas of German immigrants, also oktoberfest and kerb (Hunsrückian for kermesse) are celebrated. The word chipa is derived from the German Schippe (shovel).

In the state of Santa Catarina and other regions of German immigration, the word chiloida means slingshot, from the German word Schleuder.

 Romanian 
In Romanian, German loans are especially found in names for craft items: bormaşină (drill, in German Bohrmaschine), ştecher (plug, Stecker), şurub (screw, Schr[a]ube), şubler (vernier caliper, Schublehre), şnur (electric cord, German Schnur is cord in general), but there are also: cartof (potato) Kartoffelchiflă (a scone) Kipfelbere (beer) Bier„glasvand” - Glaswand - glass wall. hingher (dogcatcher or executioner), Sax. Hoenger/German Henkerşanţ (trench) Schanzeşuncă (ham) dialect Schunke for German Schinkenşmirghel (emery) Schmirgel„șliț”: Schlitz  - fly (of men's trousers)şpighel Spiegel(esen)şpilhozen (playing trousers) Spielhoseşpis (spear) Spiessşpiţ (spiky) Spitzşplint Splintşplit (split, flint) Splittşpor (spur) Spornşpraiţ (spreader) Spreize "ștecher” - Stecker - electrical plug
„șurub” - (Schraub) - screw
 „halbă” - (Halbe, Halbliter) - half a liter of beer, a large beer.

 Russian 

After Tsar Peter the Great returned from Western Europe in the year 1698, the loan words were no longer taken from Greek and Polish. With Peter, transfers from Polish were replaced by transfers from Western languages. For the drastic reforms in the military and administration, economic and administrative experts were recruited from Germany. 1716 Peter ordered that the administrative writers learn German:"Some 30 young officials should be sent to Königsberg for the purpose of learning the German language so that they are more suitable for the college."In some sectors of handicraft, the Germans were the majority; towards the end of the 18th Century, thirty German but only three Russian watchmakers worked in St. Petersburg.

The Russian language has taken many words regarding military matters from German, for example Schlagbaum шлагбаум (boom barrier) and Marschroute маршрут (route), and also Rucksack рюкзак (backpack), Maßstab масштаб (scale, extent), Strafe штраф (in German punishment, in Russian in the meaning fine, but штрафбат - штрафной батальон - punishment unit in the military), and Zifferblatt циферблат (clock face). Also фейерверк - Feuerwerk - fireworks. Вахта - Wacht - guard; Military ranks: ефрейтер: Gefreiter - corporal; лейтенант - Leutnant - lieutenant; комендант - Kommandant - commander; граф: Graf - count and Графство - county. Also плацдарм - Platzdarm - drill area in the military, also theater of operations - originally obviously from French place d'armes. Apparently картофель - potato also comes from German: Kartoffel. Штат (Staat) means a state (like the United States), but not the concept of state in general. Штатный - means civilian (clothes), or employee (on the payroll). The origin of the word re: civilian clothes can be another German word: Stadt - city, i.e. city clothes. The word for soldier is солдат - from German Soldat, albeit French at its origin. A screw is called винт - from German Gewinde - screw thread, apparently through Polish gwind. From that винтовка - rifle. Also through Polish: казарма - barracks - from German Kaserne - via Polish Kazarma, originally Italian caserma - arsenal.

Mikhail Lomonosov, who studied in Marburg and Freiberg, is regarded as founder of the Russian mining science, mineralogy and geology. In his writings about mining and metallurgy, he uses German words, the names of metals and minerals Wismut Висмут (bismuth), Wolfram Вольфрам (tungsten), Gneis Гнейс (gneiss), Kwarz (in German spelled Quarz) Кварц (quartz), Potasch (in German Pottasche) Поташ (potash), Zink Цинк (zinc), Schpaty (German Spat) шпаты (feldspar), and the expression schteiger (German Steiger) (foreman of miners). Also the terms geolog (German Geologe) (geologist), gletscher (glacier) metallurgia (German Metallurgie) (metallurgy), nikel (in German Nickel), schichta (German Schicht (layer), used both for ore layer and layer in a blast furnace), and schlif (German Schliff) (the grinding or cutting of a stone) fall into this category.

Terms from chess are Zugzwang цугцванг, Zeitnot цейтнот, Endspiel эндшпиль (endgame), Mittelspiel миттельшпиль (middlegame), Grossmeister гроссмейстер (grandmaster).

Modern expressions are Strichcode штрихкод (barcode), Butterbrot бутерброд, and even Brandmauer, for which in German the English expression Firewall is used.Schram Шрам is a scar and originates from the German word Schramme (scratch, scar). A schtolnja штольня (German Stollen) is an adit. A schpagat шпагат (German spelling Spagat) is a Split (gymnastics), schpinat шпинат (German spelling Spinat) spinach and a schpion шпион (German spelling Spion) a spy.

Even the hockey term for puck, schajba шайба, originates from German Scheibe, denoting a disk. The word schlang шланг for garden hose is derived from the German word for a snake, Schlange. The word schtepsel штепсель originates from the German word Stöpsel (plug).

Serbian
An exhibition in Vienna about Gastarbeiter in Austria has the Serbian title gastarbajteri. A particularly avid student is called štreber (German Streber is striver). Schlag for cream is derived from the Austrian short form for Schlagobers.

The Serbian word for tomatoes, Парадајз (paradajs), is influenced from the Austrian Paradeiser. One of the Serbian words for exhaust is auspuh (derived from German Auspuff).

Slovak
Examples of Germanisms:

 brak: Brack (rubbish)
 cech: Zeche (guild)
 cieľ: Ziel (goal/target)
 cín: Zinn (tin)
 deka: Decke (blanket)
 drôt: Draht (wire)
 faloš: Falschheit (falsity)
 farba: Farbe (color)
 fašiangy: Fasching (carnival)
 fialka: Veilchen (viola)
 fľaša: Flasche (bottle)
 fúra: Fuhre (load)
 gróf: Graf (count)
 hák: Haken (hook)
 helma: Helm (helmet)
 hoblík: Hobel (hand plane)
 jarmok: Jahrmarkt (funfair)
 knedl'a: Knödel (dumpling)
 minca: Münze (coin)
 ortieľ: Urteil (verdict)
 pančucha: Bundschuh (stocking)
 plech: Blech (sheet metal)
 regál: Regal (shelf)
 ruksak: Rucksack (backpack)
 rúra: Rohr (pipe)
 rytier: Ritter (knight)
 šachta: Schacht (mine shaft)
 šindeľ: Schindel (roof shingle)
 šnúra: Schnur (cord)
 taška: Tasche (purse)
 téma: Thema (topic)
 vaňa: Badewanne (bathtub)
 Vianoce: Weihnachten (Christmas)
 vločka: Flocke (flake)
 žumpa: Sumpf (cesspit)

Swedish
Swedes use the German word aber (but) in the sense of "obstacle" or "objection". A nouveau riche is called Gulaschbaron (colloquialism in German language, literally "goulash baron").

For undercover investigative journalism in the style of Günter Wallraff the verb wallraffa is used, which is even part of the Swedish Academy's dictionary.

 Slovene 
Slovene Germanisms are primarily evident in the syntax, lexicon, semantics, and phraseology of the language. There are few Germanisms in Slovene phonology and morphology. Many Slovene lexical Germanisms come from Austrian German.

 Spanish 
The Spanish language of some South American countries incorporates Germanisms introduced by German immigrants, for example, in Chile kuchen ("cake") and Frankfurter in Uruguay. The latter, however, sometimes is used for a hot dog – not as in German for the sausage only. In Argentine, the usage of the name Pancho is interesting: it's a popular nickname for Francisco or Franco, and therefore also used for Frankfurter sausages. The Chileans pronounce kuchen as in German with the ach-Laut, not "kutshen", as a Spanish pronunciation would be.

In Chile, the German word suche ("searching") (pronounced in Chile sutsche instead of with the German ach-Laut) is used for house staff (gardeners, errand boys). After the German immigrants came to a certain prosperity, they posted job advertisements for local forces, which often started with the German verb suche in a large-size font (cf. Imperial German influence on Republican Chile).

In Mexico, kermes, from the German word Kirmes ("funfair", "kermesse"), is used for a charitable street party.

 Swahili 
The dominant lingua franca in the African Great Lakes region, Swahili, has borrowed many words from Arabic and English. Borrowed from the German Schule, however, is the word  shule for school.

 Tok Pisin 
Even the Kreol Tok Pisin in the former German colony Papua-New Guinea has words borrowed from German language. These include balaistift from German Bleistift for "pencil", however today the English term is preferred. Raus (literally in German get out! means "Go!" or "From the way". Derived from raus is rausim meaning "empty", "dismissed away."

A reminder of the missionary by German Catholic lay brothers are the words bruda from German Bruder for brother and prista from German Priester for priests. A relic of German colonialists' behaviour are invectives such as rinfi from German Rindvieh, literally cattle, but used also as invective for a silly person, and saise from German Scheiße, shit.

 Turkish 
The Turkish word fertik as signal for a railway to be ready to depart originates from the Baghdad Railway which was initially operated by German personnel. The Germans command fertig (ready) became the Turkish fertik and firstly also denoted the train conductor. Nevertheless, this word was only used in slang and became obsolete soon after the 1950s.

Another Germanism is Otoban from German Autobahn for highway.

 Impact on grammar 

The Modern Hebrew iton for newspaper is modeled after the German word Zeitung, using et for "time" (Zeit in German).

Derivations of German words
Germanisms in foreign languages may have gone through a change of meaning, appearing as false friend to the learned's eye. For instance, in Russian галстук galstuk is not a scarf (German literally: "Halstuch"), but a tie, even though the modern German equivalent "Krawatte" (Croatian neck tie) seems to be of a more recent date; nor would a  парикмахер parikmacher (German literally: "Perückenmacher") be a "wig-maker", but actually is  a hairdresser. It seems, though, that the hair dresser was indeed called a wig maker, i.e. when wigs were in fashion and that was what they did. Thus both Italians (parrucchiere) and Spaniards (peluquero) still call all hair dressers, for gentlemen and ladies, wig makers.

Likewise, in Japanese, a messer is not a knife, but a scalpel. Two more examples would be Japanese アルバイト (transliterated to "arubaito", derived from German: Arbeit ["work"] and abbreviated to "baito") and リュックサック (transliterated to "ryukkusakku"; derived from German "Rucksack"; abbreviated to リュック ["ryukku"]).

See also
Loanword
List of German expressions in English

References

Literature
Karl-Heinz Best: Deutsche Entlehnungen im Englischen. In: Glottometrics. H. 13, 2006, S. 66–72 (PDF ram-verlag.eu).
I. Dhauteville: Le français alsacien. Fautes de prononciation et germanismes. Derivaux, Strasbourg 1852. (Digitalisat)
Jutta Limbach: Ausgewanderte Wörter. Hueber, Ismaning 2007, . (Beiträge zur internationalen Ausschreibung „Ausgewanderte Wörter“)
Andrea Stiberc: Sauerkraut, Weltschmerz, Kindergarten und Co. Deutsche Wörter in der Welt. Herder, Freiburg 1999, .

 External links 
 "From 'Kaffeklatsching' to 'Wischi-Waschi'– when German Words Take a Trip around the World.". December, 2006. (German version)
 www.sueddeutsche.de, Süddeutsche Zeitung: „Deutsche Wörter erobern die Welt“, May 11, 2004.
 www.sueddeutsche.de, Süddeutsche Zeitung: „Die Fremdgeher“, January 7, 2001.
 www2.rz.hu-berlin.de/japanologie, (Phonologische Angleichung deutscher Lehnwörter im Japanischen)
 
 www.welt.de – Die Welt: „Deutsche Fremdwörter setzen sich in Holland zunehmend durch“,'' October 7, 1995.
 www.etymologie.info (Eine Liste Wörter deutschen Ursprungs in anderen Sprachen)
 SpreadGermanisms.com (Interactive collection of Germanisms)
www.spiegel.de (Foresprug durk Tecnic)

German language